The 1964 Arkansas State Indians football team represented Arkansas State College—now known as Arkansas State University—as an independent during the 1964 NCAA College Division football season. Led by second-year head coach Bennie Ellender, the Indians compiled an overall record of 7–0–2 with a mark of 2–0–2 in conference play, finishing second out of five teams in the Southland.

Schedule

References

Arkansas State
Arkansas State Red Wolves football seasons
College football undefeated seasons
Arkansas State Indians football